"Tobias Mindernickel" is an early short story by Thomas Mann. Written in 1897, while Mann was living in Rome with his elder brother Heinrich it was first published in January 1898 in the German literary magazine Neue Deutsche Rundschau. It has subsequently appeared in several anthologies of Mann's short stories and novellas.

English translations 

 H. T. Lowe-Porter, published in Stories of Three Decades (Alfred Knopf, 1936)
 Joachim Neugroschel, published in Death in Venice and Other Stories (Penguin, 1998)
 Jefferson S. Chase, published in Death in Venice and Other Stories (Signet, 1999).

References

External links
Complete English translation by Jefferson Chase on the official website of Penguin Books
Bjorklund, Beth (1978) "Thomas Mann's “Tobias Mindernickel” in Light of Sartre's 'Being-for-Others'". Studies in 20th Century Literature, Vol. 2, Issue 2, Article 2. 

1898 short stories
Short stories by Thomas Mann
Works originally published in German magazines